Love Brought Me Back is the fifth album by D. J. Rogers, released in 1978. It was recorded at Bolic Sound and Total Experience Recording Studio. This would be D. J. Rogers first Columbia Records album.

Overview
The album peaked at #54 on the Billboard Top Soul Albums chart. The singles "Love Brought Me Back" and "All My Love" charted on the Billboard R&B chart, reaching #20 and #87 respectively.

Critical reception

With a four out of five stars rating Will Smith of the Omaha World Herald wrote "A note bending, gospel based direction akin to Stevie Wonder's is the product of singer D.J. Rogers. The uplifting nature of Rogers' tunes, lyrics and arrangements makes "Love Brought Me Back" (Columbia JC 35393) special."  Sam Caputo of the Courier News found that " I haven't heard a more solid album of soul music in a long time. D.J. Rogers has been making albums for years but has not garnered the all-encompassing fame of Stevie Wonder, whose music his resembles. Rogers is completely responsible for the resemblance (although he may not be aware of it) as he sang, composed, arranged, produced, conducted and played keyboard for the entire album." Caputo added "The album is great for dancing and Rogers writes lyrics which are slightly better than Stevie's." Elton Alexander of the Dayton Daily News said "Not bad stuff. Produced, written, arranged and conducted by Mr. Rogers, this platter will do well in any record collection. A lot of brass and hard-driving soul, especially in the title tune. This man has some talent and displays it well."

Track listing
All songs written by D. J. Rogers except where indicated

"Love Brought Me Back" - 5:29		
"Joy From You" - 2:49		
"When Love Is Gone" - 5:25 		
"Yesterday Never Returns" - 3:40 		
"Sold On You" - 4:39		
"You Take Me Higher (Brazilian Lover)" - 3:28		
"Hold Me" - 3:29		
"All My Love" - 5:58 		
"Changed" (Walter Hawkins) - 2:18

Personnel
D. J. Rogers - clavinet, fender rhodes, Yamaha electric piano, Yamaha concert grand piano, lead and backing vocals
Keni Burke - bass
Patrice Rushen - synthesizer
James Gadson - drums
Jerry Peters - piano
Paulinho Da Costa - percussion
Michael Wycoff - organ, piano, vocals
Marlo Henderson, Charles Bynum - guitar
Robert Lynn Wilson - bass, background vocals
Claude Wilson, Ronnie Wilson, Nolan Andrew Smith, Ray Brown - trumpet
David Majal Li - tenor saxophone
Deniece Williams, Mary Russell, Charlie Wilson, Maxayn Lewis, Mary Ann Lindsay, Phyllis Lindsey, Joseph Greene, Anita Anderson, Jesse Kirkland - backing vocals

Charts

Singles

External links
 D. J. Rogers-Love Brought Me Back at Discogs

References

1978 albums
D. J. Rogers albums
Columbia Records albums
Albums recorded at Total Experience Recording Studios
Albums recorded at Bolic Sound